Hồ Thị Lỷ (born February 22, 1991 in Đông Hà, Quảng Trị Province) is a Vietnamese rower. She and Tạ Thanh Huyền placed 18th in the women's lightweight double sculls event at the 2016 Summer Olympics.

References

External links
 

1991 births
Living people
People from Quảng Trị province
Vietnamese female rowers
Olympic rowers of Vietnam
Rowers at the 2016 Summer Olympics
Rowers at the 2018 Asian Games
Medalists at the 2018 Asian Games
Asian Games medalists in rowing
Asian Games gold medalists for Vietnam
21st-century Vietnamese women
20th-century Vietnamese women